Hye-ja is a Korean feminine given name. Its meaning depends on the hanja used to write each syllable of the name.

Hanja
There are 16 hanja with the reading "hye" and 28 hanja with the reading "ja" on the South Korean government's official list of hanja which may be used in given names. Typically, "ja" is written with a hanja meaning "child". Names ending with this hanja, such as Young-ja and Jeong-ja, were popular when Korea was under Japanese rule, but declined in popularity afterwards. Some ways of writing this name in hanja include:

 , with the first hanja meaning "favour" or "kindness"; this can also be read as a Japanese given name Keiko.

People
People with this name include:
Patti Kim (singer) (born Kim Hye-ja, 1938), South Korean singer 
Han Hye-ja (born 1941), South Korean speed skater
Kim Hye-ja (born 1941), South Korean actress
Lee Hye-ja (born 1947), South Korean track and field athlete
Kang Hye-ja (born 1966), South Korean sport shooter

Fictional characters with this name include:
Kang Hye-ja, in 2009 South Korean television series He Who Can't Marry
Pi Hye-ja, in 2009 South Korean television series Assorted Gems
Lee Hye-ja, in 2011 South Korean television series While You Were Sleeping

See also
List of Korean given names

References

Korean feminine given names